Stan Smith was the defending champion of the men's singles event at the Australian Indoor Championships but did not compete that year.

Unseeded Geoff Masters won in the final 4–6, 6–3, 7–6, 6–3 against James Delaney.

Seeds

Tanner, Rosewall and Dent received a bye to the second round. Tony Roche was originally seeded fifth but was forced to withdraw before the start of the tournament due to a stomach muscle injury.

Draw

Finals

Top half

Section 1

Section 2

Bottom half

Section 3

Section 4

References

Singles